Euphorbia ensifolia is a species of plant in the family Euphorbiaceae. It is endemic to Madagascar.  Its natural habitat is subtropical or tropical high-altitude grassland. It is threatened by habitat loss.

References

Endemic flora of Madagascar
ensifolia
Vulnerable plants
Taxonomy articles created by Polbot
Taxa named by John Gilbert Baker